Gustavo Alberto Cristaldo Brítez (born 31 May 1989) is a Paraguayan international footballer who plays for General Díaz, as a midfielder.

Career
Cristaldo has played for Libertad, Sol de América and Rubio Ñu.

He made his international debut for Paraguay in 2011, and participated at the 2009 FIFA U-20 World Cup.

References

External links

1989 births
Living people
People from Caacupé
Paraguayan footballers
Paraguay international footballers
Paraguay under-20 international footballers
Paraguayan Primera División players
Chilean Primera División players
Ecuadorian Serie A players
Club Libertad footballers
Club Rubio Ñu footballers
Club Sol de América footballers
Sportivo Luqueño players
Club Nacional footballers
Cobreloa footballers
Deportes Concepción (Chile) footballers
Deportivo Santaní players
Fuerza Amarilla S.C. footballers
General Díaz footballers
Paraguayan expatriate footballers
Paraguayan expatriate sportspeople in Chile
Paraguayan expatriate sportspeople in Ecuador
Expatriate footballers in Chile
Expatriate footballers in Ecuador
Association football midfielders